The Cayman Islands national basketball team represents the Cayman Islands in international competitions. It is administrated by the Cayman Islands Basketball Association. Its best result was 9th place at the 2015 FIBA CBC Championship.

Roster
Team for the 2015 FIBA CBC Championship.

Competitions

FIBA AmeriCup
yet to qualify

Caribbean Championship

Commonwealth Games

never participated

See also
Cayman Islands women's national basketball team
Cayman Islands women's national under-17 basketball team

References

External links
Presentation at CaribbeanBasketball.com
Archived records of the Cayman Islands team participations
Cayman Islands Basketball Association  - Facebook Presentation
Cayman Islands Men National Team 2015 Presentation at Latinbasket.com

Videos
 Cayman Islands v Virgin Islands - Group A - 2015 CBC Championship Youtube.com video

Men's national basketball teams
Basketball
Basketball teams in the Cayman Islands
1976 establishments in the Cayman Islands